Ruanruan (also called Rouran) is an unclassified extinct language of Mongolia and northern China, spoken in the Rouran Khaganate from the 4th to the 6th centuries AD, considered a likely early precursor to Mongolic.

Peter A. Boodberg claimed in 1935 that the Ruanruan language was Mongolic by analysing Chinese transcriptions of Ruan-ruan names. Atwood (2013) notes that Rourans calqued the Sogdian word pūr "son" into their language as *k’obun (Chinese transliteration: 去汾 MC *kʰɨʌH-bɨun > Mandarin qùfén); which, according to Atwood, is cognate with Middle Mongol kö'ün "son". Alexander Vovin noted that Old Turkic had borrowed some words from an unknown non-Altaic language that might have been Ruan-ruan, arguing that if so, the language would be non-Altaic language, unrelated to its neighbours and possibly a language isolate, though evidence was scant. In 2019, with the emergence of new evidence through the analysis of the Brāhmī Bugut and Khüis Tolgoi, Vovin changed his view, suggesting Ruan-ruan was, in fact a Mongolic language, close but not identical to Middle Mongolian. Pamela Kyle Crossley (2019) wrote that the Rouran language itself has remained a puzzle, and leading linguists consider it a possible isolate.

Phonology 
Features of Ruan-ruan included:
no mid vowels
presence of initial l-
final consonantal cluster -nd unusual for any "Altaic" languages

Morphology
Ruan-ruan had the feminine gender suffix -tu-.

Lexicon
Ruan-ruan vocabulary included:
küskü – 'rat'
ud – 'ox'
luu – 'dragon' < Middle Chinese luŋ – 'dragon'
yund – 'horse' <  - 'horse'
laγzïn – 'pig'
qaγan – 'emperor'
qan – 'khan'
qaγatun – 'empress'
qatun – 'khan's wife'
aq – 'dung'
and – 'oath' <  'oath'
beg – 'elder'
bitig – 'inscription'
bod – 'people'
drö – 'law'
küǰü – 'strength' <  'strength, power'
ordu – 'camp'
tal- – 'to plunder'
törö – 'to be born'
türǖg – 'Turk'

References 

Unclassified languages of Asia
Languages of China
Medieval languages
Extinct languages of Asia
Rouran
Xianbei